A golok is a cutting tool, similar to a machete, that comes in many variations and is found throughout the Malay archipelago. It is used as an agricultural tool as well as a weapon. The word golok (sometimes misspelled in English as "gollock") is used in Indonesia and Malaysia and (spelled gulok) in the Philippines. Both in Malaysia and in Indonesia, the term is usually interchangeable with the longer and broader parang. In the Sundanese region of West Java it is known as bedog.

Description
Sizes and weights vary, as does blade shape, but the typical length is 25 to 50 centimeters. Golok tend to be heavier and shorter than parang or common machetes, often being used for bush and branch cutting. Most traditional golok use a convex edge or an edgewise taper, where the blade is less likely to get stuck in green wood than flat edged machetes. The blade is heaviest in the centre and flows away in a curve to a sharp point at the tip.

Golok are traditionally made with a springy carbon steel blade of a softer temper than that of other large knives. This makes them easier to dress and sharpen in the field, although it also requires more frequent attention. Although many manufacturers produce factory-made golok, there are still handmade productions that are widely and actively made in Indonesia.

History

In Indonesia, the golok is often associated with the Betawi and neighboring Sundanese people. The Betawi recognize two types of golok; gablongan or bendo is the domestic tool used in the kitchen or field for agricultural purposes, and the golok simpenan or sorenam that is used for self-protection and traditionally always carried by Betawi men. The golok is a symbol of masculinity and bravery in Betawi culture. A jawara (local strongman or village champion) will always have a golok hung or tied around the waist at the hips. This custom, however, has ceased to exist since the 1970s, when authorities would apprehend those that carry the golok publicly and have it confiscated it in order to uphold security, law and order, and to reduce gang fighting.

Sundanese, Javanese and Malay golok have also been recorded. The use of golok in Malay was recorded as early as the Hikayat Hang Tuah (text dated 1700) and Sejarah Melayu (1612),

Modern application

The golok style is noted for being the pattern for British Army-issue machetes used since the early 1950s.

See also

Bolo knife
Klewang
Kukri

References

Blade weapons
Machetes
Weapons of Indonesia
Weapons of Malaysia
Weapons of the Philippines
Weapons of the Philippine Army